Hondo is an American Western drama series starring Ralph Taeger that aired on ABC from September 8 until December 29, 1967 during the 1967 fall season. The series was produced by Batjac Productions, Inc., Fenady Associates, Inc., and MGM Television.

Overview

Hondo is based on the 1953 3D film of the same name starring John Wayne and Geraldine Page, which was in turn an offshoot of a July 5, 1952 Collier's short story "The Gift of Cochise". Below the name of the teleplay author, each episode states, "Hondo" based on a screen play by James Edward Grant / from a story by Louis L'Amour.

The storyline concerns Hondo Lane, a former Confederate cavalry officer who had moved west following the Civil War and taken an Indian bride, only to see her killed as part of a massacre of Indians conducted by United States Army troops. Now Hondo and his dog, Sam, travel alone and seek to prevent further trouble between the Army and the remaining Indians. They also fight to counter land grabbers and other outlaws.

Noah Beery Jr. portrays Hondo's frequent sidekick, Buffalo Baker, who had been played by Ward Bond in the original movie version with John Wayne. The little boy, Johnny Dow, is played by Buddy Foster, older brother of Jodie Foster.

While the Wayne film had been fairly successful, this series, airing against the hit sitcom Gomer Pyle, U.S.M.C. on CBS and Star Trek on NBC, was soon canceled, with the last broadcast occurring on December 29, 1967.

The rule of thumb for broadcast syndication is at least 100 episodes, but Hondo, with only seventeen segments, became popular after it left the air and became the subject of an article in the Wall Street Journal.  One venue for broadcasting Hondo during early 2020s has been GetTV.

The first two episodes were edited together to form the feature film Hondo and the Apaches, which was released theatrically outside of North America.

Cast

Episodes

Home media
On June 13, 2017, Warner Bros. released the entire series on DVD via their Warner Archive manufacture-on-demand service.

References

External links

 
 Brooks, Tim and Marsh, Earle, The Complete Directory to Prime Time Network and Cable TV Shows

American Broadcasting Company original programming
English-language television shows
1967 American television series debuts
1967 American television series endings
1960s Western (genre) television series
Television series by MGM Television
Television series by Warner Bros. Television Studios
Television shows set in Arizona